I Am a Thief is a 1934 American crime-drama film directed by Robert Florey.

Plot 
Mary Astor portrays Odette as an undercover police agent who hopes to provoke, and catch, an international jewel thief, as he transports the famous Karenina diamonds from Paris across Europe to Istanbul on the Orient Express, along with a trainload of suspicious characters.

Cast 
 Mary Astor as Odette Mauclair
 Ricardo Cortez as Pierre Londais
 Dudley Digges as Colonel Jackson
 Robert Barrat as Baron Von Kampf
 Irving Pichel as Count Trentini
 Hobart Cavanaugh as Daudet
 Ferdinand Gottschalk as M. Cassiet
 Arthur Aylesworth as Francois
 Florence Fair as Mme. Cassiet
 Frank Reicher as Max Bolen
 John Wray as Antonio Borricci
 Oscar Apfel as Auctioneer
 unbilled cast members include Clay Clement and Gino Corrado

External links 
 

1934 films
1934 crime drama films
American crime drama films
Films directed by Robert Florey
Warner Bros. films
Films produced by Henry Blanke
Films set on the Orient Express
American black-and-white films
1930s American films
Films scored by Bernhard Kaun